Olga Benário Prestes (Brazilian Portuguese: /ˈɔwgɐ beˈnaɾju prɛstʃis/, February 12, 1908 – April 23, 1942) was a German-Brazilian communist militant executed by Nazi Germany.

Biography

Olga was born in Munich as Olga Gutmann Benário, to a Jewish family. Her father, Leo Benário, was a Social Democrat lawyer, and her mother, Eugenie (Gutmann), was a member of Bavarian high-society. In 1923, aged fifteen, she joined the Communist Youth International and in 1928 helped organize her lover and fellow party member Otto Braun's escape from Moabit prison. She went to Czechoslovakia and from there, reunited with Braun, to Moscow, where Benário attended the Lenin-School of the Comintern and then worked as an instructor of the Communist Youth International, in the Soviet Union and in France and Great Britain, where she participated in coordinating anti-fascist activities. She parted from Otto Braun in 1931.

After her stay in Britain, where she was briefly arrested, Olga attended a course in the Zhukovsky Military Academy, leading some historians to view her as an agent of Soviet military intelligence. Due to her military training, in 1934 she was given the task of helping the return to Brazil of Luís Carlos Prestes, to whom she was assigned as a bodyguard. In order to accomplish this mission, false papers were created stating that they were a Portuguese married couple. By the time they arrived at Rio de Janeiro in 1935, this cover had become a reality, as the couple had fallen in love. After a failed insurrection in November 1935, Benário and her husband went into hiding, and after barely escaping a police raid at Ipanema, they were both eventually arrested in January 1936, during the harsh anti-communist campaign declared after Getúlio Vargas had proclaimed martial law and was already plotting the 1937 coup that eventually led to the institution of the fascist-like Estado Novo regime.

Pregnant and separated from Prestes, Benário clung to her alias, only to have her real identity disclosed by Brazilian diplomats, working hand-in-hand with the Gestapo. Her lawyers attempted to avoid extradition by means of a habeas corpus at the Brazilian Supreme Federal Court based on her pregnancy, because extradition would have left a newborn Brazilian national in the power of a foreign government. As Brazilian law forbids the extradition of nationals, Olga's lawyers expected to win time until Olga gave birth on Brazilian soil to an ipso facto Brazilian citizen - irrespective of the child's paternity, which remained legally doubtful in the absence of evidence for Olga's and Prestes' marriage - something that would have rendered extradition quite unlikely. The plea, however, was speedily quashed, the rapporteur-justice alleging that habeas corpus was superseded by martial law and that Olga's deportation was justified as "an alien noxious to public order". 

After the Brazilian supreme court's decision, and despite an international campaign, Olga was forcibly returned to Germany in September 1936. The captain of the German liner that took her cancelled scheduled stops in non-German European ports, foiling communist attempts at rescuing her. On arrival, she was put in prison in Berlin, where on November 27 she gave birth to a daughter, Anita Leocádia. At the age of fourteen months, the child was released into the care of her paternal grandmother, Leocádia Prestes. 

After the birth of her child, Olga was sent to Lichtenburg concentration camp in 1938, transferred to Ravensbrück concentration camp in 1939, and finally to Bernburg Euthanasia Centre in 1942, where she was gassed alongside hundreds of other female political prisoners.

Aftermath

As Vargas joined the United Nations and Brazil entered World War II against the Axis, Luís Carlos Prestes, the father of Anita Leocádia and former partner of Olga Benário, eventually struck a political partnership with him in order to avoid Vargas' immediate ousting in 1945, which was demanded both by his more rightist domestic opponents and by Adolf Berle as US ambassador. This move was in line with Popular Front Communist policies of the time: Prestes argued that, by declaring himself against Vargas' immediate resignation, he wanted to avoid a "redemptory coup" as well as to take a stand against "the decrepit remains of reaction". Her arrest in Brazil and eventual extradition to Nazi Germany, where she would die in Ravensbrück concentration camp was also made by possible by the collaboration of Britain's MI6 with the Brazilian authorities.

Legacy

Jorge Amado, in his 1942 biographical novel "Vida de Luis Carlos Prestes", compared Olga Benario with Ana Ribeiro da Silva, the Brazilian wife of Garibaldi - and remarked that "in the person of Olga, Europe repaid the debt to Latin America" (i.e., in her case it was a European woman revolutionary who married a Latin American revolutionary leader).

In the postwar German Democratic Republic, Olga was presented as the model of the female revolutionary, and the writer Anna Seghers wrote a biographical sketch about her for International Women's Day in 1951.

Along with Yevgenia Klemm, Antonina Nikiforova, Mela Ernst, Rosa Jochmann, Katja Niederkirchner, Rosa Thälmann, Olga Körner, Martha Desrumaux, Minna Villain and Maria Grollmuß, Olga Benário Prestes was one of the prominent prisoners in the Ravensbrück concentration camp who were publicly commemorated during the liberation celebrations at the Ravensbrück National Memorial of the GDR.

Olga Benário was the subject of an opera Entre la Piel y el Alma by G. P. Cribari, which premiered in Glasgow at the Royal Scottish Academy of Music and Drama on May 22, 1992.

In the GDR Ruth Werner published a successful biographical novel for young readers about Olga Benario in 1961.

In 2004, a popular Brazilian film based on Benário's life, Olga, directed by telenovela director Jayme Monjardim, which offered a thoroughly depoliticized account of Olga's life, centered on her love affair with Prestes, was released, to the disappointment of German critics, who called it "kitsch advertising".

Also in 2004 she was the subject of a German documentary (with reconstructed scenes) directed by the former assistant to Rainer Werner Fassbinder, Galip Iyitanir, Olga Benário - Ein Leben für die Revolution.

In 2006, the opera Olga, by Jorge Antunes, premiered on October 14 at the Theatro Municipal in São Paulo, Brazil.

In 2009 Olga Benario was one of three female protagonists in Swiss writer Robert Cohen's vast novel about the anti-fascist exile Exil der frechen Frauen.

In January 2013, the English translation of the play Olga's Room by German playwright Dea Loher, was presented by the Speaking in Tongues Theatre Company at the Arcola Theatre in London.

In 2013 Robert Cohen edited the exchange of letters from prisons and concentration camps between Olga Benario and Luiz Carlos Prestes.

In 2016 Robert Cohen published an edited version of the only recently accessible large dossier of documents of the Gestapo on Olga Benario. 

In 2019 Cohen published an extensive research paper on Benario's life: "The Perpetrators and their Victim. A Report on the Gestapo Dossier on Olga Benario."

See also
 Anita Leocádia Prestes, her daughter

References

External links

  A short biography
  Another short biography

1908 births
1942 deaths
German communists
Jewish socialists
Anti-revisionists
Jewish anti-fascists
People extradited from Brazil
People extradited to Germany
Ravensbrück concentration camp
Resistance members who died in Nazi concentration camps
Aktion T4 victims
People from Bavaria executed in Nazi concentration camps
Politicians from Munich
People killed by gas chamber by Nazi Germany
International Lenin School alumni
People murdered at the Bernburg Euthanasia Centre
German Jews who died in the Holocaust
Executed communists in the German Resistance